Dorstenia umbricola is a plant species in the family Moraceae which is native to Peru and Ecuador.

References

umbricola
Plants described in 1931
Flora of Ecuador
Flora of Peru